British School of Tenerife (BST) is a British international school in Tenerife, Spain. It serves levels early years through sixth form college. The school has campuses in La Orotava and Los Realejos. 

It was founded in 1967.

Notes

External links
 
 British School of Tenerife 

Tenerife
Educational institutions established in 1967
1967 establishments in Spain
British international schools in Spain
British international schools in Africa